Command Ridge is the highest point of Nauru, with an elevation of .

Passing close to Command Ridge is the boundary between Aiwo and Buada districts.

History 
Nauru was once occupied by the Japanese during World War II. Command Ridge contained their communications bunker on Nauru, and some remnants of it remain, including rusted WWII guns/artillery. The bunker itself contains Japanese writing on the walls

See also
Geography of Nauru

References

External links
 Adventure Details: Command Ridge, Topoworld.com.
 Command Ridge, Lonelyplanet.com

Command Ridge
Highest points of countries